Halloween is a horror video game for the Atari 2600, released in October 1983 by Wizard Video. It is based on the 1978 horror film of the same name. The game was programmed by Tim Martin. When Games by Apollo went broke, Martin and another former employee, Robert Barber, developed Halloween.

Although the game was called Halloween, and featured the film's theatrical poster as its cover art as well as the movie's main music theme, the game itself never refers to any characters, including the killer, by their names in the film.

Gameplay
 
In 1983, Halloween was adapted as a video game for the Atari 2600 by Wizard Video. None of the main characters in the game were named. Players take on the role of a teenage babysitter who tries to save as many children from an unnamed, knife-wielding killer as possible. In another effort to save money, most versions of the game did not even have a label on the cartridge. It was simply a piece of tape with "Halloween" written in marker. The game contained more gore than the film, however. When the babysitter is killed, her head disappears and is replaced by blood pulsating from the neck as she runs around exaggeratedly. The game's primary similarity to the film is the theme music that plays when the killer appears onscreen.

The player obtains points in two ways: by rescuing children and taking them to "safe rooms" located at both ends of each floor of the house, and by stabbing the killer with the knife (if it can be located). The player advances a level either by rescuing five children or stabbing the killer twice. The killer gets faster with each level increase, and the game continues until all of the player's three lives are lost.

Controversy and legacy
Like Wizard Video's other commercial release, The Texas Chainsaw Massacre, Halloween was a controversial title at the time due to its violent content and subject matter. Many game retailers refused to carry the game and the ones who did often kept it behind the counter on a request-only basis.

Halloween, along with The Texas Chainsaw Massacre, drove Wizard Video Games to bankruptcy. While Wizard Video Games were liquidating its merchandise, some copies of the game were shipped and sold without a label, or with a simple white sticker with "HALLOWEEN" hand-written on it to cut costs. This led to even more stores rejecting the game due to its appearance.

Halloween had a slightly better reception than their The Texas Chainsaw Massacre, although the limited number of copies sold has made both games highly valued items among Atari collectors.

Reviews
Electronic Fun with Computers & Games - Nov, 1983
All Game Guide - 1998

References

External links
 Halloween at Atari Mania
 Halloween at AtariAge

1980s horror video games
1983 video games
Atari 2600 games
Atari 2600-only games
Halloween (franchise) mass media
Halloween video games
Obscenity controversies in video games
Single-player video games
Video games based on films
Video games developed in the United States